Shakin' with the Money Man is a 1997 album by Eddie Money.

Tracks
 Something To Believe In (Money/Cuomo/Hitchings)
 If We Ever Get Out Of This Place (Stanley/Cuomo/Girvin/Money)
 Can You Fall In Love Again (Waite/Denicola)
 Everybody Loves Christmas (Money/Cuomo)
 Two Tickets To Paradise  (Money)
 I Wanna Go Back (Byrom/Walker/Chauncey)
 She Takes My Breath Away (Money/Byrom/Morgan/Tanner/Bromham)
 Where's the Party? (Money/Carter)
 Gimme Some Water (Money)
 Wanna Be A Rock-N-Roll Star (Money/Solberg)
 Everybody Rock-N-Roll The Place (Money/Lyon)
 Baby Hold On (Money/Lyon)
 Take Me Home Tonight (Leeson/Vale/Greenwich/Barry/Spector)
 Shakin' (Money/Carter/Meyers)

Personnel

Musicians Track 1 - 4 :

Eddie Money (lead vocals)

Ronnie Spector (guest vocals on track 4)

Curt Cuomo (backing vocals on track 1, 2, 4)

Kim Bullard (keyboards on track 3)

Richie Zito (guitars on track 1, 2, 4)

Tommy Girvin (guitars/background vocals on track 1, 2 / backing vocals on track 4)

Arther Burrows (bass and keyboards on track 1, 2, 4)

Mark Harris (bass on track 3)

Matt Laug (drums on track 1, 2)

Kenny Aronoff (drums on track 3)

Mike Beard (drums on track 4)

Bill Mason (B-3 on track 1, 2)

Band line-up track 5 - 14 :

Eddie Money (lead vocals)

Tommy Girvin (lead guitars)

Bill Mason (keyboards)

Trent Strow (bass)

John Snider (drums)

Bobby Levine (percussion)

Dean Mitchell (rhythm guitar)

NOTES :
Track 1, 2; Produced by Richie Zito, Curt Cuomo and Eddie Money.

Track 3 ; Produced by Kim Bullard, Curt Cuomo and Eddie Money.

Track 4 ; Produced by Richie Zito.

Track 5 - 14 ; Recorded Live At The Galaxy Theatre July 30 and 31, 1997.

Produced by Curt Cuomo and Eddie Money.

Live album by Eddie Money which includes 4 new studio-tracks.
"If We Ever Get Out Of This Place" written by Paul Stanley, Curt Cuomo, Eddie Money and Tommy Girvin . This song is a re-written version of "If We Ever", which appeared on both Stan Bush albums Higher Than Angels and The Child Within.

References

1997 albums
Eddie Money albums